William Seward Burroughs I (January 28, 1857 – September 14, 1898) was an American inventor born in Rochester, New York.

Life and career

Personal life 
Burroughs was the son of a mechanic and worked with machines throughout his childhood. While he was still a small boy, his parents moved to Auburn, New York, where he and his brothers were educated in the public school system.

He married his wife, Ida (née Selover) in 1879. They had two sons and two daughters: Jennie, Horace, Mortimer (father of William S. Burroughs II), and Helen.

Inventor 
In 1875, he started working as a clerk in a bank. Much of his job consisted of long hours reviewing ledgers for errors. At this time, Burroughs became interested in developing an adding machine. At the bank, there had been a number of prototypes, but in inexperienced users' hands, they would sometimes give incorrect and even outrageously wrong answers. Burroughs' did not find his clerical work agreeable, as he was fond of, and talented, with mechanics. After seven years working as a clerk at the bank, he resigned.

In the early 1880s, Burroughs was advised by a doctor to move to an area with a warmer climate; he moved to St. Louis, Missouri where he obtained a job in the Boyer Machine Shop. These new surroundings, which appealed to him more, hastened the development of an idea he had already, of an adding machine. His new job gave him the opportunity to build his prototype of the adding machine. Accuracy was the foundation of his work. He made his design drawings on metal plates, to prevent distortion. 

Burroughs filed his first patent, for the invention of a "calculating machine" in 1885. It was designed to ease the monotony of clerical arithmetic. By 1890, the machines were well known in the banking industry, and adoption was spreading.

Company founder 
Burroughs founded the American Arithmometer Company in 1886. After his death, partner John Boyer renamed the business, calling it the Burroughs Adding Machine Company, from 1904 onward.

He was awarded the Franklin Institute's John Scott Legacy Medal shortly before his death. He was posthumously inducted into the National Inventors Hall of Fame. He was the grandfather of Beat Generation writer William S. Burroughs and great-grandfather of William S. Burroughs Jr., who was also a writer.

Burroughs also received a patent for an electric alarm clock in 1892.

He died in Citronelle, Mobile County, Alabama and was interred in Bellefontaine Cemetery in St. Louis, Missouri.

Patents
  Calculating-machine. Filed January 1885, issued August 1888.
  Calculating-machine. Filed August 1885, issued August 1888.
  Calculating-machine. Filed March 1886, issued August 1888.
  Calculating-machine. Filed November 1887, issued August 1888.
Electric alarm clock. Issued February 1892.
Calculating machine. Issued week ending September 5, 1893

References

External links
 Burroughs Corporation Records Charles Babbage Institute, University of Minnesota, Minneapolis. Collection contains the records of the Burroughs Corporation, and its predecessors the American Arithmometer Company and Burroughs Adding Machine Company.
 William S. Burroughs biography and science resources at The Franklin Institute's Case Files online exhibit
 Burroughs Adding Machine Burroughs Registering Accountant at The Franklin Institute.
 

American manufacturing businesspeople
19th-century American inventors
American people of English descent
Businesspeople from Rochester, New York
William S. Burroughs
1857 births
1898 deaths
Burials at Bellefontaine Cemetery
Burroughs Corporation
American technology company founders
Burroughs Corporation people